First Presbyterian Church of Arlington, Virginia is a congregation in the National Capital Presbytery, the Synod of Mid-Atlantic and the Presbyterian Church (USA).

History 
Church member Cynthia Bolbach was the Moderator of the 219th General Assembly of the Presbyterian Church (USA).

The church formed on February 22, 1872.  The Church was located at what was the corner of Wilson Blvd and Glebe Road in Arlington up until December 9, 1951, when the congregation moved to the new, and present site about two blocks away, at the corner of Vermont Street and Carlin Springs Road.

Present 
The current Pastor is the Reverend Dr. Bryan Mickle. 
Address:  601 North Vermont Street, Arlington, VA 22203

See also 
First Presbyterian Church,  Arlington,  Virginia, USA

References

Presbyterian churches in Virginia
Buildings and structures in Arlington County, Virginia